Stanisław Kostanecki (born 16 April 1860 in Myszaków, now in Poland then Kingdom of Prussia – 15 November 1910 in Würzburg) was a Polish organic chemist, professor who pioneered in vegetable dye chemistry e.g. curcumin. Known for Kostanecki acylation name reactions.

In 1896, he developed the theory of dyes and studied the natural vegetable dyes. Among his many students were famous scientists Kazimierz Funk and Wiktor Lampe.

1860 births
1910 deaths
Polish organic chemists